Mr. Jingeling is the "Keeper of the Keys" to Santa's workshop - a holiday tradition in Cleveland, Ohio. Mr. Jingeling was originally sponsored by Halle's, a local department store. He served as the store's Christmas season spokesman on television and also acted as Santa's representative in the store. 

Mr. Jingeling became the "Keeper of the Keys" as a reward for saving Christmas when Santa lost the key to his Treasure House of Toys. Jingeling saved the day by making a new key.

Mr. Jingeling was created in 1956 by Frank Jacobi, head of a Chicago advertising agency to promote the toys sold at Halle's Department Store in Cleveland. This was originally planned as a one-time promotion for the 1956 holiday season, but was immediately popular and became an annual tradition.

Mr. Jingeling was Santa's top elf who counted down the days from Thanksgiving to Christmas for Santa.  He wore a green and gold costume with a wide black belt and carried a large keyring with all the keys for Santa's workshop. He had white hair like Santa, but was bald on top and had no beard.

He could be found between Thanksgiving and Christmas on the seventh floor of Halle's. After Halle's closed in 1982, Mr. Jingeling moved to Santaland on the tenth floor of Higbee's Department Store. He was assisted in his duties by the Play Lady, also in costume.
Children could sit on his lap and tell Mr. Jingeling what they wanted for Christmas, knowing he had a direct connection to Santa. At the end of the visit, he gave each child a large cardboard key. The children were told to put the key under their pillow on Christmas Eve. This would help them fall asleep and have good dreams while waiting for Santa to come.

During the Christmas season, Mr. Jingeling also appeared for a five-minute daily segment on the Captain Penny local children's television series on WEWS-TV (Channel 5) where he would tell stories and sing songs about the North Pole. His appearances began and ended with the Mr Jingeling advertising jingle, which reminded children that he could be seen in person on the seventh floor of Halle's Department Store. 

The Mr. Jingeling theme song:

Mister Jingeling/How you ting-a-ling/Keeper of the keys/On Halle's seventh floor/We'll be looking for/You to turn the keys

Variation:

Mister Jingeling/How you ting-a-ling/Keeper of the keys/Don't you dare be late/For you have a date/On Halle's seventh floor

Mr. Jingeling was first played in personal appearances by Tom Moviel, a Cleveland policeman who worked at the jail and actually carried jail cell door keys while playing the part. 

The television appearances were by Cleveland Play House actor Max Ellis for the first eight seasons. When Ellis died from a heart attack in the summer of 1964, Karl Mackey, managing director of Lakewood Little Theatre took over for one season. Then appropriately named Earl Keyes, (the producer/director of the Captain Penny show) took over in 1965. His wife Nadine was occasionally called on to play Mrs. Jingeling. 

Along with the department stores that had sponsored him, Mr. Jingeling went out of business in the late 1980s, Keyes acquired the copyright for the character and continued making holiday season appearances as Mr. Jingeling for many years. His last official appearance in costume was in 1995 at the Tower City Center.

In the late 1990s, the Penitentiary Glen Nature Center began a nostalgic Halle's 7th Floor Holiday Memories Exhibit including a re-creation of Mr. Jingeling's seventh-floor castle from 1956. When Keyes visited the exhibit in 1999, he was recognized by fans who formed a long line to get his autograph.

Keyes died of congestive heart failure the day after Christmas in 2000.

After several years with no Mr. Jingeling, Jonathan Wilhelm took over the role and began making public appearances during the holiday season in 2003. 

Greg Benedetto is now playing the role of Mr. Jingeling, making public appearances throughout Northeast Ohio. He hands out cardboard keys just like the ones from Halle's, singing songs, telling stories, and keeping the tradition alive for generations old and new.

References
 "Mr. Jingeling has lifelong love of fantasy", Lakewood Sun Post, June 7, 1990
 "Mr. Jingeling finds new life at 50", The Plain Dealer, October 13, 2006

External links
Mr. Jingeling - Earl Keyes
Mr. Jingeling Official Website

Santa's helpers
Local children's television programming in the United States
Television in Cleveland
Christmas characters